Ernest Joseph "Blue" Dixon (c. 1885 – c. 1941) was a rugby union player who represented Australia.

Dixon, a lock, was born in Brisbane, Queensland and claimed one international rugby caps for Australia, playing against Great Britain, at Sydney, on 30 July 1904.

References

Australian rugby union players
Australia international rugby union players
Year of birth uncertain
Rugby union players from Brisbane
Rugby union locks